Imaginarium: Songs from the Neverhood is the title of a soundtrack CD released in 2004 on Stunt Records. The 2-disc collection includes 77 songs performed by Daniel Amos frontman Terry Scott Taylor for the Doug TenNapel-created video games The Neverhood, Skullmonkeys and BoomBots. Also included are several early demos of songs that were later recorded for the video game soundtracks, as well as some songs that were left off. Also included is the theme song to the animated television pilot, Geekdad.

Musically, the Neverhood and Skullmonkeys soundtrack music follows few of the same paths as Taylor's solo or band music. It has often been described as sounding "clay-like", which was the phrase that TenNapel used when asking Taylor to create the soundtrack. The sound of distorted guitar, which is common in much of Daniel Amos' music, only makes an appearance on a couple of tracks. The lush Brian Wilson-ish productions or folk styles of Taylor's solo albums are replaced with horns, Muppet-like vocals, clunky banjos and percussion that often sounds like it's simply falling out of its storage box. There are very few lyrics to speak of, and most of the vocals consist of little more than grunts, groans, an occasional scream and other odd noises that could not be transcribed. The booklet includes what lyrics could be deciphered, and challenges the reader to "sing along".

The soundtrack to the Neverhood has won many Awards including GMR Magazine's "Best Game Music of the Year" award. GMR specifically mentioned the song "The Lil' Bonus Room", calling it the "funniest tune ever written for a video game". Tom Clancy's video game composer Bill Brown called the Neverhood soundtrack "the Best of any of them [video game soundtracks], the only music other than mine that I really like".

The album cover artwork was also created by TenNapel, and the booklet contains 10 pages of liner notes written by Taylor about the time spent making this memorable music.

Track listing 
All songs composed by Terry Scott Taylor.

Disc one (Neverhood) 
 "Klaymen Shuffle" – 1:45
 "Olley Oxen Free" – 1:20
 "Everybody Way Oh!" – 1:37
 "Rock and Roll Dixie" – 1:12
 "Cough Drops" – 1:45
 "Skat Radio" – 2:03
 "Lowdee Huh" – 1:27
 "Klaymen's Theme" – 2:42
 "Operator Plays a Little Ping Pong" – 1:11
 "José Feliciano" – 1:53
 "Homina Homina" – 1:31
 "Potatoes, Tomatoes, Gravy, and Peas" – 1:19
 "Triangle Square" – 1:08
 "Dum Da Dum Doi Doi" – 1:54
 "Southern Front Porch Whistler" – 1:23
 "Confused and Upset" – 0:57
 "The Neverhood Theme" – 3:23
 "The Weasel Chase" – 1:33
 "Pulling of the Pin" – 2:56
 "The Battle of Robot Bil" – 2:46
 "Klogg's Castle" – 2:36
 "Time to Goof Off" – 2:37
 "Klaymen Takes the 'A' Train" – 1:00
 "Low Down Doe" – 0:50
 "Gargling Drummer" – 0:38
 "Resolution #8" – 1:03
 "An Elf Sings His ABC's" – 0:28
 "Thumb Nail Sketch" – 1:11
 "I'm Thirsty, I Need Wahwah" – 0:44
 "Sound Effects Record #32" – 1:41
 "The Laughing, Crying, Screaming Masses" – 0:55
 "Sound Effects Record #33" – 1:43
 "B3, B.C." – 0:28
 "Coffee and Other Just Desserts" – 1:30
 "Spring Has Sprung" – 0:57
 "Chiming In" – 0:46
 "Scary Robot Man" – 0:43
 "Playing Pool in Outer Space" – 1:41
 "Down in the Mines" – 0:27
 "Olley Oxen Free (Early Demo)" (Bonus Track) – 1:11
 "Rock and Roll Dixie (Early Demo)" (Bonus Track) – 1:03
 "José Feliciano (Early Demo)" (Bonus Track) – 1:30
 "Klaymen's Theme (Early Demo)" (Bonus Track) – 2:17

Disc two (Skullmonkeys & BoomBots) 
 "Skullmonkeys (The Theme)" – 1:54
 "Incident at Skullmonkey Gate" – 2:01
 "She Reminded Me with Science" – 2:05
 "Monkey Shrines" – 2:11
 "Hard Boiler Eggs" – 2:03
 "Sno, Yell "Oh!"" – 1:43
 "Monkey Brand Hot Dogs" – 2:03
 "Elevated Structure of Terror" – 2:13
 "Death Garden Jive" – 2:08
 "Pineapple Mine Fields" – 2:02
 "Life Among the Weeds" – 2:08
 "The Secret Egg" – 2:08
 "Monk Rushmore (Presidential Funky Monkey)" – 1:41
 "Sour Head Hauksa Loukee" – 2:03
 "Beep Bop Bo Shards" – 2:01
 "Castle de Los Muertos (The Plate ees Hot!)" – 2:01
 "The Incredible Divy Run" – 1:54
 "The Worm Graveyard" – 2:00
 "The Evil of Engine Number Nine" – 2:08
 "Eeeeeeeeeeeeee!!!" – 2:04
 "Sub Standard Pirate" – 2:09
 "Psychedelic Boogie Child" – 1:56
 "The Lil' Bonus Room" – 2:16
 "Musical Fruit" – 0:52
 "BoomBots Bonus Song" – 2:26
 "Klogg is Dead!" – 0:51
 "Funkybots (The BoomBot Theme)" – 2:13
 "Boombombs Away!" – 1:58
 "Sister Soulboom" – 2:00
 "The Last Thing We Never Said" – 2:04
 "My Stupid Lullaby (GeekDad Theme)" (Bonus Track) – 0:58
 "Untitled Lost Demo #1" (Bonus Track) – 1:44
 "Untitled Lost Demo #2" (Bonus Track) – 3:02
 "Eee-I-Ohh (Early Demo)" (Bonus Track) – 2:44

Video game soundtracks
Albums with cover art by Doug TenNapel
2004 soundtrack albums
Terry Scott Taylor albums
Stunt Records albums